Brigadier-General Sir Ernest Makins,  (14 October 1869 – 18 May 1959) was a British military officer, statesman and Conservative Party politician.

Military career
Making was commissioned a second lieutenant in the 1st (Royal) Dragoons on 23 January 1892, was promoted to lieutenant on 31 August 1893, and to captain on 2 February 1898.

He fought in the Second Boer War between 1899 and 1902, where he took part in the Relief of Ladysmith, including the battles of Colenso (15 December 1899), Spion Kop (20–24 January 1900), Vaal Krantz (5–7 February 1900), and the Tugela Heights and Pieter's Hill (14–27 February 1900). In the following months he took part in operations in Natal March to June, and in the Orange River Colony until November 1900. He was mentioned in despatches on 10 September 1901, and appointed a Companion of the Distinguished Service Order (DSO) for his service during the war. After peace was declared in May 1902, Makins left South Africa on board the SS Bavarian and arrived in the United Kingdom the following month. He was promoted to major on 3 September 1902, and received the insignia of the DSO from King Edward VII following troop inspections on 4 November 1902.

Makins fought in the First World War, where he was also mentioned in despatches. He was appointed commander of the 6th Cavalry Brigade in September 1914. On 11 May 1915 he was promoted to temporary brigadier-general. He was Colonel of the 1st Royal Dragoons between 1931 and 1946.

Honours
 Distinguished Service Order (DSO; 1902).
 Companion, Order of the Bath (CB; 1917).
 Knight Commander of the Order of the British Empire (KBE; 1938).

Political career
He was elected at the 1922 general election as the Member of Parliament (MP) for the Knutsford division of Cheshire, and held the seat until he retired from the House of Commons at the 1945 general election.

Family
He married Maria Florence Mellor (ca. 1877 – 11 August 1972) on 31 January 1903. Their children were:

 Sir Roger Mellor Makins, 1st Baron Sherfield, KCMG (1904–1996)
 Guy Herbert Makins (5 July 1906 – 17 September 1923)
 Major Geoffrey Henry Makins (19 October 1915 – 4 September 1944)

One of Sir Ernest Makins' grandsons, by his eldest son, was Christopher J. Makins (1942—2006), a British-American diplomat

References

Sources

External links

1869 births
1959 deaths
1st The Royal Dragoons officers
Alumni of Christ Church, Oxford
British Army personnel of the Second Boer War
Conservative Party (UK) MPs for English constituencies
Companions of the Distinguished Service Order
Companions of the Order of the Bath
Knights Commander of the Order of the British Empire
People from Kensington
People from Knutsford
UK MPs 1922–1923
UK MPs 1923–1924
UK MPs 1924–1929
UK MPs 1929–1931
UK MPs 1931–1935
UK MPs 1935–1945
People educated at Winchester College
British Army generals
British Army cavalry generals of World War I